Mahakavi Kshetrayya is a 1976 Telugu-language biographical film, based on the life of Kshetrayya, produced by P. Adinarayana Rao under the Anjali Pictures banner and directed by Adurthi Subba Rao & C. S. Rao. It stars Akkineni Nageswara Rao in the title role, with Anjali Devi, Manjula as female leads, and music also composed by P. Adinarayana Rao. Actually the film direction was started by veteran Adurthi Subba Rao but he had expired in the middle of the movie and director C. S. Rao completed the movie.

Plot
The film is based on the story of Mahakavi Kshetrayya, an advent devotee of Lord Krishna in the 17th century in the village of Muvva in present-day Krishna district, Andhra Pradesh. The film begins, two bells from Lord Siva anklets plunge on earth in which first one forms as a village Muvva and the second takes an avatar as a person Varadhayya (Akkineni Nageswara Rao). Though Varadhayya is born in a respectable scholars family he is uneducated and till his teenage moves as a meander by intoning melody. Varadha loves his maternal uncle Sivaiah's daughter Rukmini (Prabha) On the other side, Bhama (Manjula) a Devadasi allures to Varadha's tunes and showers her love towards him. Bhama's brother Pichaiah (Raja Babu) is also a close friend to Varadha. Due to circumstances, Varadha is not able to marry either Rukmini or Bhama then he abuses the Lord. Here a saint Siddhendra Yogi (P. J. Sarma) explains that his life is dedicated for the Lord and preaches him a Mantra which he recites. At that juncture, Lord Krishna (Baby Rohini) appears gives him enlightenment & entrusts to scripture his divinity as vocals & lyrics which he does so. Now Varadha's songs become chart-topping when religious authorities affirm nastiness in it and ostracize Varadha. Howbeit, on the advice of Siddhendra Yogi, Varadha starts his journey to learn the life secret when he eminent as Kshetrayya. Eventually, Tanisha of Golconda (Prabhakar Reddy) listens to his tunes and honors him as his court poet which he refuses courteously. So, angered Tanisha arrests him when Bhama & Pichaiah who are in search of Varadha releases him. Later, Kshetrayya tours Kanchipuram, Chidambaram, Srirangam, etc. and lands at Thanjavur.

There, King Vijaya Raghava Nayaka (Kanta Rao) felicitates Kshetrayya with great honor who defeats all the poets in the province and proclaims Rangajamma (Anjali Devi) second wife Vijaya Raghava, a great poet as his analogous. During that time, Thanjavur has a rivalry with Madhurai when Kshetrayya tries to resolve their conflicts but fails and ensues as the destruction of Thanjavur. In that plight, Rangajamma requests Kshetrayya to safeguard their heritage and handovers the Prince Changamala Dasu. Right Now, Kshetrayya reaches Golkonda, solicits Tanisha to establish Changamala Dasu as the empire of Thanjavur as a return he is ready to stay permanently in his court. At present, both of them keep up their word, the advent of Kshetrayya irks another poet Tulasi Murthy (Rao Gopal Rao). So, to know the eminence between two fires Tulasi Murthy challenges to write a 1000 verses in 40 days. Kshetrayya accepts it, almost in an edge to win when Tulasi Murthy uses court dancer Taaramathi (Jayasudha) who ploys by seducing him through a syrup. Just in time, Bhama enters and rescues him, spotting both of them, Siddhendra Yogi misunderstands & curses Bhama that female cannot participate in Kuchipudi. After coming into conscious Kshetrayya dies out to contrition as he committed a great sin and not eligible to complete the verses. At that moment, seeks him to endorse his duty when his aura is freed from the body which successfully finishes the verses. Being aware of it, Tulasi Murthy tries to steal the verses when he loses his eyesight as divine retribution and bows his head down. At last, Lord directs Kshetrayya to reach his native place Muvva as it is the time of his salvation. Finally, the movie ends Kshetrayya transforming into bell which conjoins with Lord Siva anklets at Kailasam.

Cast

 Akkineni Nageshwara Rao as Varadhayya
 Manjula as Bhama
 Anjali Devi as Rangajamma 
 Kanta Rao as Vijaya Raghava Nayakudu 
 Prabhakar Reddy as Golkonda Nawab Tanisha
 Dhulipala as Sivaiah 
 Mukkamala
 Rao Gopal Rao as Tulasi Murthy 
 Raja Babu as Pichaiah
 Giri Babu as Manaradeva
 Raavi Kondala Rao as Venkaiah 
 P. J. Sharma as Siddhendra Yogi
 Sakshi Ranga Rao as Vikatakavi 
 Mada as Wizard 
 Gokina Rama Rao
 Hema Sundar
 Krishna Kumari as Vijaya Raghava Nayaka's wife
 Jayasudha as Taaramathi
 Prabha as Rukmini
 Hemalatha as Varadaiah's mother 
 Radha Kumari as Sivaiah's wife 
 Baby Rohini as Lord Krishna

Soundtrack

Music composed by P. Adinarayana Rao. Music released on EMI Columbia Audio Company.

Awards
 The film won Nandi Award for Second Best Feature Film - Silver - P. Adinarayana Rao (1976)

References

External links
 

1976 films
Indian biographical films
1970s Telugu-language films
1970s biographical films
Films directed by Adurthi Subba Rao
Films directed by C. S. Rao